The 1970 Australian Formula 2 Championship was an Australian motor racing title for drivers of racing cars complying with Australian Formula 2 regulations. The title, which was recognised by the Confederation of Australian Motor Sport as the fourth Australian Formula 2 Championship, was decided over a single 40-lap,  race, staged at the Lakeside circuit in Queensland, Australia on 27 September 1970. There were seven starters in the event.

The championship was won by Max Stewart driving a Mildren Waggott.

Results

Notes
 Fastest lap: Max Stewart, 53.4s, (101.31 mph), new Australian Formula 2 lap record.

References

Further reading
 Australian Motor Manual, December 1970, page 17
 Jim Shepherd, A History of Australian Motor Sport, 1980

Australian Formula 2 Championship
Formula 2 Championship
September 1970 sports events in Australia